Smilax biltmoreana, common name Biltmore's carrionflower,  is a North American plant species native to the southeastern United States. It is concentrated in the Great Smoky Mountains but with outlying populations in Virginia, North and South Carolina, Tennessee, Kentucky, Georgia, Alabama, and northern Florida.

Smilax biltmoreana is a herb with erect stems up to 60 cm (2 feet) tall. Leaves are egg-shaped to heart-shaped, with wax on the underside but no hairs. Flowers are small and greenish, fruits dark blue.

The species epithet biltmoreana refers to the Biltmore Estate in Asheville, North Carolina, once owned by George Washington Vanderbilt. Vanderbilt sponsored a significant number of botanical studies in the American Southeast in the late 19th and early 20th Centuries.

References

External links
Alabama Plant Atlas

Flora of the Southeastern United States
Plants described in 1903
Smilacaceae
Flora without expected TNC conservation status